Season 1. Hideout: Remember Who We Are is the debut extended play by South Korean boy group Cravity. It was released on April 14, 2020, by Starship Entertainment and distributed by Kakao M.

The EP was a commercial success, debuting and peaking at number one on the South Korean Gaon Album Chart. The EP has shipped over 153,525 physical copies in South Korea as of July 2020.

Singles

"Break All the Rules" is the album's title track. The song entered and peaked at number 67 on the Gaon Download Chart on the chart issue dated April 12–18, 2020.

A music video for "Cloud 9" was released on June 17, 2020.

Promotion

The group's promotions for the song "Break All the Rules" began on April 16, 2020, on Mnet's M Countdown. The B-side track "Jumper" was also performed during the group's first week of promotions. The B-side track "Stay" was performed on May 12, 2020 on The Show, while follow-up promotions for the B-side "Cloud 9" began on June 18, 2020.

Commercial performance

Season 1. Hideout: Remember Who We Are entered and peaked at number 1 on the Gaon Album Chart on the chart issue dated April 12–18, 2020. In its second week, the EP fell to number 4 and maintained its position on its third week.

The EP shipped 104,343 physical copies in its first month, charting at number 6 on the Gaon Album Chart for the month of April 2020.

Track listing

Chart performance

Album chart

Digital chart

Release history

See also
 List of Gaon Album Chart number ones of 2020

References

2020 debut EPs
Cravity EPs
Kakao M EPs
Starship Entertainment EPs